Yang Yong is the name of:

 Yang Yong (Sui dynasty) (died 604), Sui dynasty prince
 Yang Yong (general) (1913–1983), People's Liberation Army general and Governor of Guizhou
 Yang Yong (water polo) (born 1963), Chinese water polo player

See also
Yangyong, a town in Lintan County, Gansu, China